The 77th season of the Campeonato Gaúcho kicked off on February 2, 1997, and ended on June 29, 1997. Twenty-eight teams participated. Internacional beat holders Grêmio in the finals and won their 33rd title. 14 de Julho and São Borja were relegated.

Participating teams 

Aimoré and Atlético de Carazinho withdrew before the start of the championship, and to replace them, São Borja and Farroupilha were promoted to the First level.

System 
The championship would have five stages:

 Division A: The fourteen teams all played each other in a single round-robin system. The eight best teams qualified to the Second phase, while the bottom two teams would dispute the Division B in the following year. Caxias and Brasil de Pelotas, due to their performance in the 1996 Copa Daltro Menezes, were automatically qualified regardless of placing and had one bonus point in the Second phase.
 Division B: The twelve teams that had qualified to Division B in the previous year joined the two teams that had been promoted from the Second level, and were divided into two groups of seven, in which each team played the teams of its own group in a double round-robin system. the best four teams in each group qualified to the Second phase of that division, the leader of each group earning a bonus point, while the three worst teams in each group would dispute the Relegation Playoffs. In the second phase, the remaining eight teams would be divided into two groups of four, in which each team played the teams of its own group in a double round-robin system. The beat team of each group would qualify to the Second phase of the championship, and to the Division A of the following year.
 Relegation Playoffs: The six teams that had qualified to this round played each other in a double round-robin format. The two teams with the fewest points were relegated.
 Second phase: The ten remaining teams were divided into two groups of five, in which each team played the teams of its own group in a double round-robin system. The two best teams in each group qualified to the Semifinals.
 Final rounds: The remaining four teams played a series of two-legged knockout ties to define the champions.

Championship

Division A

Division B

Group 1

Group 2

Second phase

Group 3

Group 4

Relegation Playoffs

Second phase

Group 1

Group 2

Semifinals 

|}

Finals 

|}

Copa Galego 

For the second semester, a state cup was held; the Copa Galego.

The twelve teams were divided into two groups of six, in which each team played the teams of its own group in a double round-robin format. The four best teams qualified into the Second phase, disputed under the same rules. The two best teams in each group won an automatic qualification into the Second phase of the 1998 championship, and the best teams in each group qualified to the Finals, disputed in two matches.

First phase

Group 1

Group 2

Second phase

Group 3

Group 4

Finals 

|}

References 

Campeonato Gaúcho seasons
Gaúcho